The Parola-class patrol vessel consists of ten vessels currently in service with the Philippine Coast Guard. Their hull number prefix "MRRV" means they are officially classified as "multi-role response vessels". They will be named after primary lighthouses in the Philippines, with the Filipino word "Parola" meaning "lighthouse" in English. The lead ship, BRP Tubbataha, is named after a major lighthouse situated in the Tubbataha Marine National Park in Palawan.

Project planning and funding
The ships, a based on the "Maritime Safety Capability Improvement Project for the Philippine Coast Guard" project of the Philippine Coast Guard and the Department of Transportation and Communication (DOTC), and was funded by the Japan International Cooperation Agency's (JICA) Official Development Assistance (ODA) loan. JICA will provide Php 7,373,700,000.00, while the Philippine government will shoulder Php 1,434,000,000.00 of the entire project value.

Japanese shipbuilders were shortlisted by the DOTC, among them Japan Marine United Co., Mitsubishi Heavy Industries Ltd., Nigata Shipbuilding and Repair Inc., and Sumidagawa Shipyard Co. Inc.

Japan Marine United Corporation (JMU) won the tender against other Japanese shipbuilders with a bid price of Y12,790,000,000 (Php 4,600,000,000.00).

Under the project terms, the MRRVs will be used by the PCG for the following purposes:

Primary rescue vessels within the PCG Districts’ areas of responsibility (AOR) when the extent of the disaster is beyond the capability of floating assets deployed within the area
Assistance in the control of oil pollution and protection of the marine environment
Enforcement of applicable maritime laws within the designated AOR, particularly relating to illegal fishing and sea patrol
Service as platform for rapid response during relief operations in the area
Transport of personnel and logistical support.

Design and features

The Philippine Coast Guard clarified that the ships are designed for law enforcement duties, to conduct environmental and humanitarian missions, as well as maritime security operations and patrol missions.

The ships are designed with a bulletproof navigation bridge, and is equipped with fire monitors, night vision capability, a work boat, and radio direction finder capability.

The ships are equipped with communications and radio monitoring equipment from Rohde & Schwarz, specifically the M3SR Series 4400 and Series 4100 software-defined communication radios, and DDF205 radio monitoring equipment. These equipment enhances the ship's reconnaissance, pursuit and communications capabilities.

Ships in class

References

Ships built by Japan Marine United
Patrol vessels of the Philippines
Patrol boat classes